Alison Rae Hardin Narayan (born 1984) is an American chemist and the William R. Roush assistant professor in the Department of Chemistry at the University of Michigan College of Literature, Science, and the Arts. Additionally, she is a research assistant professor at University of Michigan Life Sciences Institute.

Early life and education 
Narayan grew up in Cheboygan, Michigan graduating from high school in Frankenmuth. She completed her B.S. in chemistry at the University of Michigan in 2006. During her bachelor's degree, she carried out research under the supervision of John P. Wolfe on palladium-catalyzed methodology for the synthesis of substituted tetrahydrofuran rings. Narayan completed her Ph.D. in organic chemistry in 2011 with Richmond Sarpong at the University of California, Berkeley, with a thesis entitled "New Reactions and Synthetic Strategies toward Indolizidine Alkaloids and Pallavicinia Diterpenes". In 2011, Narayan returned to the University of Michigan as a postdoctoral fellow in David Sherman's lab. During her postdoc, she engineered cytochrome P450 enzymes to perform C-H functionalization in non-native substrates. In 2015, Narayan joined the Department of Chemistry and the Life Sciences Institute at the University of Michigan as an assistant professor.

Research 
The Narayan lab focuses on identifying and characterizing enzymes from various microorganisms that can catalyze chemical reactions that are challenging to reproduce synthetically. These biocatalysts can be employed to create various chemicals for pharmaceutical or other purposes.

Awards and honors 
Narayan has received numerous awards and honors including:
American Chemical Society C&EN, Talented 12 (2016) 
 Thieme Chemistry Journals Award (2019) 
Cottrell Scholars (2019) 
Sloan Research Fellow (2019) 
Camille Dreyfus Teacher-Scholar Award (2020)

Key publications 
 Baker Dockrey, S. A. and Narayan, A. R. H. “Flavin-dependent biocatalysts in synthesis” Tetrahedron 2019  (Special Issue on Biocatalysis in Organic Synthesis).
 Lukowski, A. L.. and Narayan, A. R. H. “Natural voltage-gated sodium channel ligands: Biosynthesis and biology” ChemBioChem 2019  (Special Issue: New Talent).
 Benítez, Attabey Rodríguez; Tweedy, Sara; Dockrey, Summer A. Baker; Lukowski, April L.; Wymore, Troy; Khare, Dheeraj; Brooks L. Charles III; Smith Janet L.; Narayan Alison R.H. (2018): Structural Basis for Selectivity in Flavin-Dependent Monooxygenase-Catalyzed Oxidative Dearomatization. ChemRxiv. Preprint.   
 Baker Dockrey, S. A.; Doyon, T. J.; Perkins, J. C.; Narayan, A. R. H. “Whole-cell biocatalysis platform for gram-scale oxidative dearomatization of phenols”Chem. Biol. Drug Des. 2018 
 Lukowski, A. L.; Ellinwood, D. C.; Hinze, M. E.; DeLuca, R. J.; Du Bois, J.; Hall, S.; Narayan, A. R. H. "C–H hydroxylation in paralytic shellfish toxin biosynthesis" J. Am. Chem. Soc., 2018, 140 (37), 11863–11869 
 Chun, S. W.; Hinze, M. E.; Skiba, M. A.; Narayan, A. R. H. "Chemistry of a unique polyketide-like synthase" J. Am. Chem. Soc. 2018, 140, 2430–2433. 
 Baker Dockrey, S. A.; Lukowski, A. L.; Becker, M. R.; Narayan, A. R. H.  “Biocatalytic site- and enantioselective oxidative dearomatization of phenols” Nature Chem. 2018, 10, 119–125. 

Mentored Key Publications

 “Enzymatic Hydroxylation of an Unactivated Methylene C–H Bond Guided by Molecular Dynamics Simulations” (Nat. Chem. 2015, DOI: 10.1038/nchem.2285)
 “Directing Group-Controlled Regioselectivity in an Enzymatic C–H Bond Oxygenation” (J. Am. Chem. Soc. 2014, DOI: 10.1021/ja5016052) 
 “Indolizinones as Synthetic Scaffolds: Fundamental Reactivity and the Relay of Stereochemical Information” (Org. Biomol. Chem. 2012, DOI: 10.1039/clob06423a)

References

External links 
 Chemical Biology faculty profile
 
 Department of Chemistry faculty profile
 Life Sciences Institute faculty profile
 

1984 births
University of Michigan faculty
University of Michigan College of Literature, Science, and the Arts alumni
University of California, Berkeley alumni
21st-century American chemists
Living people
Sloan Research Fellows
American women scientists
American women academics
21st-century American women scientists